On 6 December 2015, a car bomb attack killed Aden governor, Major General Jaafar Mohammed Saad, and his entourage. Saad's caravan was traveling to his office in a western district of Aden. 

The Islamic State of Iraq and the Levant Yemen branch claimed responsibility for the car bomb. They described Saad as an oppressor and infidel and threatened further attacks in Yemen. The group stated that they detonated the bomb as Saad's convoy passed where the car was parked.

The explosion was powerful and was heard from 10 km away. Six bodyguards of Saad were killed and several people injured. Medics stated the victims bodies were unrecognizable. Photographs, supposedly of the attack, showed a burning, wrecked car.

The Islamic State released a video under Aden-Abyan Province media, which the bombing was part of it.

References

External links
 Video of Car bombing of Aden governor

2015 murders in Yemen
Terrorist incidents in Aden
Terrorist incidents in Yemen in 2015
ISIL terrorist incidents in Yemen
December 2015 events in Yemen
21st century in Aden
Car and truck bombings in Yemen
Mass murder in 2015